Eumeta is a genus of bagworm moths. There are 18 described species found in Africa, Asia and Oceania.

Species
Eumeta bougainvillea
Eumeta cervina
Eumeta crameri
Eumeta hardenbergi
Eumeta layardi
Eumeta maxima
Eumeta mercieri
Eumeta minuscula
Eumeta moddermanni
Eumeta nietneri
Eumeta pictipennis
Eumeta pryeri
Eumeta rotunda
Eumeta rougeoti
Eumeta sikkima
Eumeta strandi
Eumeta variegata
Eumeta wallacei

References
Eumeta at Encyclopedia of Life

Psychidae
Psychidae genera